Jack Howard may refer to:

Jack Howard (ice hockey) (1909–1983), Canadian ice hockey defenseman
Jack Howard (cricketer) (1915–1993), English cricketer
Jack Howard (athlete) (born 1981), Micronesian sprinter
Jack R. Howard (1910–1998), American broadcasting executive
St George Henry Rathborne (1854–1938), who wrote under this pseudonym
Jack Howard, a member of the musical group Hunters & Collectors

See also
John Howard (disambiguation)